Evening of the Harvest is the fourth album by Translator, released in 1986 on 415 Records, and distributed by Columbia Records.

In 2007, the album was released on CD for the first time by Wounded Bird Records.  The CD release included 2 songs from a single as bonus tracks.

Track listing
"Standing in Line"
"These Old Days"
"Crazier Everyday"
"I Need You to Love"
"Is There a Heaven Singing"
"Winter Crying"
"Stony Gates of Time"
"Complications"
"Point of No Return"
"Tolling of the Bells"
"Evening of the Harvest"

2007 CD bonus tracks

"Today" (single)
"Ronnie Raygun Blues" (b-side)

References

1986 albums
Translator (band) albums
Albums produced by Ed Stasium
415 Records albums
Columbia Records albums